Tashkent Stock Exchange is the major securities trading platform and the only corporate securities exchange in Uzbekistan. It was founded by government in 1994 as an open joint stock company, located in the capital of Uzbekistan - Tashkent.

Overview
It has a license for the exchange activity given by State committee of competition and regulated under the Laws of Uzbekistan on exchanges (1992), on joint stock companies (1996), on securities market(2008)as well as a number of under-law legal acts of government and securities commission.

According to presidential decree dated March 19, 2012 Korea Exchange (KRX) is expected to become a shareholder of Tashkent RSE in 2014 by acquiring 25 percent in the equity capital. Meantime, shareholders of RSE are local largest commercial banks and state.   

Historically, securities market of Uzbekistan formed due to massive privatization in 1990s of state owned enterprises after collapse of Soviet Union and gaining independence from Moscow. Unlike Russian Federation, Uzbek government gradually privatized SOE, first reorganized them into joint stock companies and then sold only part of shares in equity capital through stock exchange. As a result, there are no extremely wealthy business magnates so called "oligarchs" in Uzbekistan, while number of shareholders exceeds 1.2 million. Nowadays, state keeps controlling shareholder power at few major industrial enterprises of the country.

The Tashkent Stock Exchange is a member of the Federation of Euro-Asian Stock Exchanges.

References

Stock exchanges in Asia
Economy of Tashkent